Arabilla is a small Aymara hamlet. It is in the highlands of the Tarapacá Region (Chile), on the shores of the Arabilla lagoon and the Isluga river. It is located 26km from Colchane and 1 km from Enquelga. Its inhabitants live from agriculture, livestock and handicrafts.

References 

Populated places in Chile
Populated places in Tarapacá Region